Claudia Pechstein (born 22 February 1972) is a German speed skater. She has won five Olympic gold medals. With a total of nine Olympic medals, five gold, two silver, and two bronze, she was previously the most successful Olympic speed skater, male or female, of all-time, (later superseded by Ireen Wüst during the 2018 Winter Olympics in PyeongChang). Pechstein is the most successful German Winter Olympian of all-time. After the World Championships in Norway in February 2009, Pechstein was accused of blood doping and banned from all competitions for two years.

Biography
Pechstein was born in East Berlin. She held a world record on the 5000 m track with the time 6:46.91 achieved on the Utah Olympic Oval in Salt Lake City on 23 February 2002, which was beaten by Martina Sáblíková on the same oval five years later. Pechstein is a sergeant in the German Federal Police and trains at the force's sports training centre at Bad Endorf.

Pechstein is the first female Winter Olympian to win medals in five consecutive Olympics (1992–2006); she won the gold medal in the women's 5000 metres race in three consecutive Olympics (1994, 1998, 2002), with bronze in the first (1992) and the silver medal in the fifth (2006). In the 3000 metres, she won three medals, gold (2002), silver (1998), and bronze (1994). She won her fifth Olympic gold medal in the team pursuit at the 2006 Winter Olympics in Turin. After missing the 2010 Vancouver Games, she made her sixth Olympic appearance at the 2014 Sochi Games, finishing fourth in the 3000 metres and fifth in the 5000 metres. In 2018 she appeared in the Pyeongchang Games.

As reported by Olympic news outlet Around the Rings, Pechstein is aiming for an Olympic return, this time as a cyclist. "I will start in the individual pursuit at the German Track Championships from 6 to 10 July in Berlin", she said. "I am also planning to race the individual sprint or the 500-meter time trial. I trust I can do this because as a skater I've trained a lot on the bike. I have nothing to lose. I don't know how this kind of competition works, so this alone is really exciting".

In 2022 she returned to the Olympic Games and was the German flag-bearer for the opening ceremony in Beijing. It was her eighth participation in the Olympic Winter Games and a new record for most Winter Olympics for a female athlete.

Two-year ban because of blood doping

After the World Championships in Norway in February 2009, the International Skating Union accused Pechstein of blood doping and banned her from all competitions for two years. This ban was based on irregular levels of reticulocytes in her blood. These levels were highest during the Calgary World Cup 2007 and the Hamar World Championships in 2009; elevated levels were also found during a number of other competitions and training spot checks.

In "Autonomy and Biopower in the Anti-Doping Establishment: A Rogue Agent of Governmentality," sport historian Daniel Rosenke reviews Pechstein's case, citing it as an example of the contentious nature of the biological passport. After collecting sample data on the skater for a period of nearly nine years, the ISU banned Pechstein from competition for an above threshold fluctuation in reticulocyte percentage, a blood parameter used in passport profiling. Notably, Pechstein argued her ‘%Retics’ of 3.49 fell into the normal range for women her age and asserted that the International Skating Union’s (ISU) threshold limit of 2.4 was far too low, basing this claim on a confluence of data in medical science. Two weeks following the 3.49 reading, Pechstein was tested again at 1.37, a difference considered by the ISU to be an unequivocal sign of doping. To defend herself, Pechstein cast doubt upon the accuracy of the ‘%Retics’ measurement, citing both her hemoglobin and hematocrit levels as exculpatory evidence. In short, she questioned the reliability and accuracy of the entire procedure's longitudinal sample collection, which ultimately led to her violation of the ISU's anti-doping code. Finally, Pechstein interrogated the burden of proof to be met by the ISU in proving a doping violation. She suggested as the CAS pointed out, that "the ISU must convince the panel (of arbitrators) to a level very close to ‘beyond reasonable doubt’ that all alternative causes for the increase of %Retics can be excluded, and that additionally, the [a]thlete had an intention to use blood doping." An important consideration here is that the burden of proof should be proportional the severity of the accusation (according to the World Anti-Doping Code), and in legal terms, should fall closer to beyond a reasonable doubt than the ‘comfortable satisfaction’ of the panel. With the information presented, it seems Pechstein’s assertion was valid and cast serious doubt on the so-called ‘clear-cut’ positive described by the ISU.

Pechstein denied that she had doped and appealed to the Court of Arbitration for Sport (CAS) in Lausanne, claiming, among other things, that she has an inherited condition explaining the abnormal measurements. The court affirmed the ban in November 2009, finding no evidence for an inherited condition in the expert testimony provided by Pechstein. This was the first case of doping based on circumstantial evidence alone; no forbidden substances were ever found during her repeated tests.

In December 2009, she asked the Federal Supreme Court of Switzerland for an injunction. She was allowed to participate at a single 3000 m race in Salt Lake City so that she could qualify for the 2010 Winter Olympics in Vancouver should her appeal of the ban be successful. She finished 13th in the race on 11 December but would have needed a place among the top 8 to qualify for the Olympics.

In January 2010, the Swiss Federal Supreme Court refused to temporarily suspend Pechstein's ban for the Olympics. On 19 February 2010 the CAS ad hoc panel at the Vancouver Olympics rejected Pechstein's last-minute appeal to be admitted to the ice skating team events.

In February 2010, Pechstein filed a criminal complaint in Switzerland against the International Skating Union, alleging trial fraud.

On 15 March 2010, Gerhard Ehninger, head of the German Society for Hematology and Oncology, said that an evaluation of the case points to a light form of blood anemia called spherocytosis – apparently inherited from her father. Pechstein attempted to use this new evidence in her appeal before the Federal Supreme Court of Switzerland. The International Skating Union issued a press release explaining their opposition to this appeal.

Pechstein stood to lose her position with the German Federal Police should blood doping have been proved "beyond reasonable doubt". Disciplinary proceedings against her were halted in August 2010 because no such proof was available. Pechstein applied for unpaid leave in order to be able to continue her training, which was denied. As a result, she suffered a nervous breakdown in September 2010.

The Swiss Federal Supreme Court issued its final ruling on 28 September 2010, rejecting Pechstein's appeal and confirming the ban. Pechstein returned to competition in February 2011.
She next won the bronze medal in the 2011 World Championships in the 5000 m race, finishing behind world champion Martina Sáblíková from the Czech Republic and her teammate Stephanie Beckert.

After this, Pechstein charged the International Skating Union for damages before German courts. While on 7 June 2016, the lower Federal Court of Justice of Germany rejected her initial appeal, on 3 June 2022, the higher Federal Constitutional Court of Germany ruled that Pechstein's fundamental rights had been violated. Based on that decision, the case for damages was sent back to the lower courts for re-trial and is currently still pending.

Skating records

Personal records

She is currently in 6th position in the adelskalender.

World records

Olympic records

Results

Source: SpeedSkatingStats.com

See also
List of multiple Olympic gold medalists
List of multiple Winter Olympic medalists
List of multiple Olympic medalists in one event
List of people from Berlin

References

External links

 
 Claudia Pechstein at SpeedSkatingStats.com
 
 
 
 
  
 

1972 births
German female speed skaters
German sportspeople in doping cases
Doping cases in speed skating
German police officers
Speed skaters at the 1992 Winter Olympics
Speed skaters at the 1994 Winter Olympics
Speed skaters at the 1998 Winter Olympics
Speed skaters at the 2002 Winter Olympics
Speed skaters at the 2006 Winter Olympics
Speed skaters at the 2014 Winter Olympics
Speed skaters at the 2018 Winter Olympics
Speed skaters at the 2022 Winter Olympics
Olympic speed skaters of Germany
Medalists at the 1992 Winter Olympics
Medalists at the 1994 Winter Olympics
Medalists at the 1998 Winter Olympics
Medalists at the 2002 Winter Olympics
Medalists at the 2006 Winter Olympics
Olympic medalists in speed skating
Olympic gold medalists for Germany
Olympic silver medalists for Germany
Olympic bronze medalists for Germany
Speed skaters from Berlin
Living people
World Allround Speed Skating Championships medalists
World Single Distances Speed Skating Championships medalists
Recipients of the Order of Merit of Berlin
People from East Berlin